Hamarøy Church is a parish church of the Church of Norway in Hamarøy Municipality in Nordland county, Norway.  It is located in the village of Presteid. It is the church for the Hamarøy parish which is part of the Ofoten prosti (deanery) in the Diocese of Sør-Hålogaland. The white, modern, concrete church was built in a fan-shaped style in 1974 using plans drawn up by the architect Nils Toft. The church seats about 400 people.

History
Hamarøy Church is located on an old church site. The earliest existing historical records of the church date back to 1589, but the building wasn't new at that time. It was a timber-framed cruciform design. In 1771, the church was inspected and described as "dilapidated", so planning began for a new replacement church. In 1775, the old church was torn down and a new cruciform church was constructed on the same site.

In 1814, this church served as an election church. Together with more than 300 other parish churches across Norway, it was a polling station for elections to the 1814 Norwegian Constituent Assembly which wrote the Constitution of Norway. This was Norway's first national elections. Each church parish was a constituency that elected people called "electors" who later met together in each county to elect the representatives for the assembly that was to meet in Eidsvoll later that year.

In 1840, the church was renovated, including a new tower on the roof and a new sacristy. By royal decree on 28 October 1882, it was ordered to demolish Hamarøy's old church and build a new church with 700 seats on a site further to the north. Another royal decree from 19 September 1885, ordered that after the new church was completed, the old church was taken down and moved to the village of Karlsøy on the nearby island of Finnøya where it was rebuilt and is now known as the Sagfjord Church. In October 1969, Hamarøy Church burned down after a lightning strike. The present church was completed in 1974 on the same site as the previous building.

Media gallery

See also
List of churches in Sør-Hålogaland

References

Hamarøy
Churches in Nordland
20th-century Church of Norway church buildings
Churches completed in 1974
14th-century establishments in Norway
Norwegian election church
Fan-shaped churches in Norway
Concrete churches in Norway